João Marcelino Arroio (or Arroyo; 4 October 1861, Porto — 18 May 1930, Colares (Sintra)) was a Portuguese composer. He is best known for his opera Amor de Perdição. He notably founded the Orfeon Académico de Coimbra in 1880.

References

1861 births
1930 deaths
19th-century classical composers
19th-century Portuguese people
Portuguese male classical composers
Male opera composers
Musicians from Porto
Portuguese classical composers
Portuguese opera composers
19th-century Portuguese male musicians
Naval ministers of Portugal